Chhatrapati Shivaji Maharaj  (1627–1680) was an Indian warrior king and founder of the Maratha Empire.

Shivaji or Sivaji may also refer to:

People

Historical people
 Shivaji of Thanjavur (fl. 1832–1855), Raja of the Bhosale dynasty
 Shivaji III, (1830–1866), Raja of Kolhapur of the Bhosale dynasty
 Shivaji III of Thanjavur (fl. 19th century), pretender to the throne of the Thanjavur Maratha kingdom
 Shivaji IV (1863–1883), Raja of Kolhapur of the Bhosale dynasty
 Shivaji V (1941–1946), Raja of Kolhapur of the Bhosale dynasty

Actors
 Sivaji Ganesan (1928–2001), Indian actor in Tamil, Telugu, Kannada, Malayalam and Hindi films
 Shivaji (Malayalam actor) (1957–2004)
 Sivaji (Telugu actor), active since 1997
 Shivaji Dev (born 1989), Indian actor in Tamil films, grandson of Sivaji Ganesan
 Shivaji Guruvayoor, Indian actor in Malayalam films, active since 1990
 Shivaji Satam (born 1950), Indian actor in Hindi and Marathi films
 Sayaji Shinde, Indian actor in Marathi, Hindi, Tamil, Telugu, Kannada, and Malayalam films
 Rajinikanth (born 1950), Indian actor in Tamil films, birth name Shivaji Rao Gaekwad
 Sivaji Raja, Indian comedian and actor in Telugu films
 Shivaji Lotan Patil, Indian film director

Politicians and activists
 Karem Shivaji, Indian social activist
 Shivaji Mane, Indian politician

Others
 Shivaji Sawant (1940–2002), Indian novelist

Places
 Sivaji Park, a park in Visakhapatnam, Andhra Pradesh, India
 Shivaji Park, a park in Mumbai, India
 Shivaji Park metro station, West Delhi, India
 Shivaji Place, a commercial centre in West Delhi, India

Schools
 Shivaji College, a constituent college of the University of Delhi
 Shivaji College, Karwar, a college in Karnataka, India
 Shivaji High School, Karwar, a high school in Karnataka, India
 Shivaji University, a university in Kolhapur, Maharashtra, India

Other uses
Sivaji (film), a 2007 Tamil film by S. Shankar
 Sivaji (soundtrack), an album by A. R. Rahman
 Sivaji Productions, an Indian film distributing and producing company

See also
Shiva (disambiguation)
Shivji (disambiguation)